This article is a comparison of notable CRM systems.

ERP systems are considered a superset of CRM systems.

General 

Only stable releases are mentioned.

Features

See also 
 Comparison of mobile CRM systems
 List of ERP software packages (Enterprise Resource Planning)
 Customer relationship management (CRM)

References 

Customer relationship management software
CRM systems